Li Dan (Christian name: Andrea Dittis; died 1625) was a Chinese merchant and pirate. He was a prominent early 17th century Chinese merchant and political figure, originally from Quanzhou in Fujian province.

Li operated out of Manila for a time before moving to Hirado, in Japan and becoming a part of the shuinsen trade, with a formal vermillion seal license from the Tokugawa shogunate. He served as head of the Chinese community in Hirado, and maintained a residence in the English sector of the city.

Pedro Yan Shiqi reportedly been the second of command of Li Dan.

Following his death, Li Dan's business was inherited by Zheng Zhilong, along with his role in the community.

References

This article's content is based on that from the corresponding article on the Japanese Wikipedia.

1625 deaths
17th-century Chinese businesspeople
Businesspeople from Fujian
Chinese merchants
Chinese pirates
Kapitan Cina
People from Quanzhou
Year of birth unknown